The Fuero de Sepúlveda was a medieval municipal charter (fuero) that governed the towns that make up the Villa y Tierra de Sepúlveda. It was confirmed in 1076 by Alfonso VI of León and ratified by King Ferdinand IV of Castile in 1305. Its text reproduces privileges dating from the time of Count Fernán González.Its relevance in the Reconquest process led to its later application to other towns, such as Roa or Uclés (1179) in the Kingdom of Castilla and Teruel (1172) in the Kingdom of Aragon.

References 

History of the province of Segovia
1076
11th century in Spain
Castile (historical region)